Mauricio Andrés Cuero Castillo (born 28 January 1993) is a Colombian footballer who plays as a winger for Argentinian club Independiente.

Club career
Born in Tumaco, Cuero was a La Equidad youth graduate. He made his first team – and Categoría Primera A – debut on 23 October 2011, coming on as a late substitute in a 1–0 away win against Independiente Medellín.

On 29 January 2014 Cuero moved abroad, after agreeing to a three-year contract with Romanian Liga I side FC Vaslui. He made his debut in the category on 23 February, again from the bench in a 0–0 draw at CFR Cluj.

After being rarely used, Cuero was loaned to Club Olimpo on 16 July 2014. He scored his first professional goal on 8 November, scoring his team's second in a 2–1 home win against Quilmes AC.

On 8 January 2015 Cuero moved to Club Atlético Banfield on loan, still owned by La Equidad. He scored seven goals for the side in 29 appearances, as his side finished eighth.

On 10 November 2015, Levante UD reached an agreement with La Equidad for the transfer of Cuero, who is expected to sign a three-year deal with the Valencian side. On 21 July 2016, after suffering relegation, he signed for Santos Laguna.

On 5 June 2017, Club Santos Laguna's president, Alejandro Irarragorri, announced that they had loaned Cuero to Xolos de Tijuana.

Honours
Colombia U20
2013 South American Youth Championship: 2013

References

External links

1993 births
Living people
People from Tumaco
Colombian footballers
Association football wingers
La Equidad footballers
FC Vaslui players
Olimpo footballers
Club Atlético Banfield footballers
Levante UD footballers
Atlas F.C. footballers
Club Atlético Belgrano footballers
Club Tijuana footballers
Santos Laguna footballers
Categoría Primera A players
Liga I players
Argentine Primera División players
La Liga players
Liga MX players
Colombia under-20 international footballers
Colombian expatriate footballers
Colombian expatriate sportspeople in Romania
Colombian expatriate sportspeople in Argentina
Colombian expatriate sportspeople in Spain
Colombian expatriate sportspeople in Mexico
Expatriate footballers in Romania
Expatriate footballers in Argentina
Expatriate footballers in Spain
Expatriate footballers in Mexico
Sportspeople from Nariño Department